ACS Macro Letters is a peer-reviewed scientific journal published by the American Chemical Society. , ACS Macro Letters has the highest impact factor of any journal in the field of polymer science (6.131). With the launch of ACS Macro Letters, all Communications to the Editor that were formerly published in Macromolecules will be published as Letters in ACS Macro Letters. Researchers are advised turn to ACS Macro Letters for reports of early, urgent results in polymer science and to Macromolecules for more detailed discussions of comprehensive research findings.

Scope 
Examining both synthetic and naturally occurring polymers, ACS Macro Letters reports major advances in polymer synthesis, modification reactions, characteristics, theory, simulation, surface properties, and kinetics and mechanisms.  The journal reports on all areas of soft matter science where macromolecules play a key role, including nanotechnology, self-assembly, supramolecular chemistry, biomaterials, energy, and sustainable materials.

Readership 
ACS Macro Letters is intended for researchers in polymer science as well as materials science, nanotechnology, pharmaceuticals, and energy.  The journal makes it possible for these researchers to stay abreast of the most urgent research results in polymer science and its related disciplines.

Types of Articles 
ACS Macro Letters publishes peer-reviewed…
 Letters: Short reports of original research focused on an individual finding of great significance to the field of polymer science.
 Viewpoints: In-depth examinations and perspective on topics of current interest to researchers in the field.

Editor-in-Chief 
Timothy P. Lodge served as the Founding Editor-in-Chief of ACS Macro Letters (2011–2017). In 2018, Lodge was succeeded by Stuart J. Rowan, who was formerly the Deputy Editor.

Submissions 
ACS Macro Letters enables researchers in the field to bring their important findings in polymer science and related disciplines to the attention of the global scientific community.  Manuscripts are typically published within four to six weeks of manuscript submission.  The journal encourages submissions and publishes Letters from around the world.

See also 
 Biomacromolecules
 Macromolecules

References

External links 
 ACS Macro Letters Home Page
 Information for Authors & Reviewers

American Chemical Society academic journals
Chemistry journals